Soft-bodied organisms are animals that lack skeletons. The group roughly corresponds to the group Vermes as proposed by Carl von Linné. All animals have muscles but, since muscles can only pull, never push, a number of animals have developed hard parts that the muscles can pull on, commonly called skeletons. Such skeletons may be internal, as in vertebrates, or external, as in arthropods. However, many animals groups do very well without hard parts. This include animals such as earthworms, jellyfish, tapeworms, squids and an enormous variety of animals from almost every part of the kingdom Animalia.

Commonality 
Most soft-bodied animals are small, but they do make up the majority of the animal biomass. If we were to weigh up all animals on Earth with hard parts against soft-bodied ones, estimates indicate that the biomass of soft-bodied animals would be at least twice that of animals with hard parts, quite possibly much larger. Particularly the roundworms are extremely numerous. The nematodologist Nathan Cobb described the ubiquitous presence of nematodes on Earth as follows:

"In  short, if all the matter in the universe except the nematodes were swept away, our world would still be dimly recognizable, and if, as disembodied spirits, we could then investigate it, we should find its mountains, hills, vales, rivers, lakes, and oceans represented by a film of nematodes. The location of towns would be decipherable, since for  every massing of human beings there would be a corresponding massing of certain nematodes. Trees would still stand in ghostly rows representing our streets and highways. The location of the various plants and animals would still be decipherable, and, had we sufficient knowledge, in many cases even their species could be determined by an examination of their erstwhile nematode parasites."

Anatomy
Not being a true phylogenetic group, soft-bodied organisms vary enormously in anatomy. Cnidarians and flatworms have a single opening to the gut and a diffuse nerve system. The roundworms, annelids, molluscs, the various lophoporate phyla and non-vertebrate chordates have a tubular gut open at both ends. While the majority of the soft-bodied animals typically don't have any kind of skeleton, some do, mainly in the form of stiff cuticles (roundworms, water bears) or hydrostatic skeletons (annelids).

While lack of a skeleton typically restricts the body size of soft-bodied animals on land, marine representatives can grow to very large sizes. Siphonophores may grow to considerable sizes too, though they are colonial organisms, and each single animal is small. Most soft-bodied organisms are as small or smaller, even microscopic. The various organisms grouped as mesozoans and the curious Placozoa are typically composed of just a few hundred cells.

Fossil record 

The lack of hard parts in soft-bodied organisms makes them extremely rare in the fossil record. Accordingly, the evolutionary histories of many of the soft-bodied groups are poorly known. The first major find of fossil soft-bodied animals was from the Burgess Shale in Canada. Today, several sites with Burgess Shale type preservation are known, but the history of many groups of soft-bodied animals is still poorly understood.

References 

Zoology
Biological classification